The 1992 Macau Grand Prix was a motor race held in two parts on the Guia Circuit in Macau on 21 & 22 November 1992. It was 39th Macau Grand Prix and the ninth edition to be open to Formula Three cars. The race also carried the title of FIA Formula 3 Intercontinental Cup.

The race was won by Rickard Rydell driving a TOM's 032F - Toyota for TOM's Racing.

Entry list

Race Results 
The race was won by Rickard Rydell driving a TOM's 032F - Toyota for TOM's Racing. Rydell's aggregate time for the two parts was 1 hour 10 minutes 54.04 seconds.

References

External links
 The official website of the Macau Grand Prix

Macau Grand Prix
Grand
Macau